Laughtondale is a suburb of Sydney, in the state of New South Wales, Australia. It is located in the Hornsby Shire local government area.

History
Laughtondale Post Office opened on 26 November 1910 and closed in 1966.

See also
 Hawkesbury River

References

External links
  [CC-By-SA]

Suburbs of Sydney
Hawkesbury River
Hornsby Shire